Mickey's 90th Spectacular is a two-hour television special broadcast on ABC on November 4, 2018. It celebrates the 90th anniversary of the debut of Walt Disney's animated character Mickey Mouse.

Production
On August 7, 2018, Disney announced Mickey's 90th Spectacular, which will be "an evening of musical performances, moving tributes, and rare short films never before seen by the public." It was produced and directed by Don Mischer, who previously helmed the Disney specials The Muppets Celebrate Jim Henson and The Grand Opening of Euro Disney; Charlie Haykel and Juliane Hare served as executive producers.

Many guest stars appeared during the show, including Skylar Astin, Kelsea Ballerini, Kristen Bell, Miles Brown, Dwayne "The Rock" Johnson, Tom Holland, Anna Camp, Sofia Carson, Josh Gad, Tony Hale, Sarah Hyland, Wendi McLendon-Covey and Sage Steele, as well as original Mouseketeers Bobby Burgess and Sharon Baird, and Disney Chairman and CEO Bob Iger.

The special was taped at the Shrine Auditorium on October 6, 2018.

Musical performances

Release
Mickey's 90th Spectacular aired on ABC on November 4, 2018, two weeks prior to Mickey's official 90th anniversary.

See also
Mickey's 50, a 1978 special honoring Mickey Mouse's 50th birthday.
Mickey's 60th Birthday, a 1988 special honoring Mickey Mouse's 60th birthday.

References

External links

Disney television specials
American Broadcasting Company television specials
2018 television specials
2010s American television specials
2010s animated television specials